L'Heure Bleue is an album by trumpeter/flugelhornist Franz Koglmann which was recorded in Austria and Switzerland in 1991 and released on the Swiss HatART label.

Reception 

The Allmusic review by Thom Jurek states: "This intimacy, this quiet brilliance and restraint that Koglmann shows here on his works -- some of which were initially written for and performed by the Pipetet -- is a statement not only of how versed the man is in the traditions of jazz and classical music but just how aware he is of his own mates' musical strengths".

Track listing 
All compositions by Franz Koglmann except where noted
 "Leopard Lady" – 7:14
 "Moon Dreams" (Chummy MacGregor) – 3:22
 "My Old Flame" (Arthur Johnston) – 3:17
 "Monoblue" – 6:33
 "Night and Day" (Cole Porter) – 5:25
 "Baite" (Tony Fruscella) – 5:56
 "It Isn't Easy" (Ralph Richardson) – 8:10
 "L'Heure Bleue" – 7:13
 "Slow Fox" – 3:35
 "For Bix" – 6:00
 "Blue Angel" (Burkhard Stangl) – 4:28
 "Black Beauty" (Duke Ellington) – 5:12
 "Nachts" – 4:07

Personnel 
Franz Koglmann – trumpet, flugelhorn
Misha Mengelberg – piano (tracks 3, 6, 9 & 13)
Tony Coe – clarinet, tenor saxophone (tracks 1, 2, 4, 5, 7, 8 & 10-12)
Burkhard Stangl – guitar (tracks 1, 2, 4, 5, 7, 8 & 10-12)
Klaus Koch – bass (tracks 1, 2, 4, 5, 7, 8 & 10-12)

References 

Franz Koglmann albums
1991 albums
Hathut Records albums